Woodbine Brotherhood Synagogue is a historic Jewish synagogue at 612 Washington Avenue in Woodbine, Cape May County, New Jersey, United States. According to a historical marker on the property, it was founded by Russian Jews fleeing pogroms in the 1890s.

It was built in 1896 and added to the National Register of Historic Places in 1980.

Sam Azeez Museum of Woodbine History
The building now houses the Sam Azeez Museum of Woodbine History. Exhibits include the community's Russian Jewish immigrant heritage, local history and culture.

See also
 National Register of Historic Places listings in Cape May County, New Jersey

References

External links

 Sam Azeez Museum of Woodbine History - official site

Russian-American culture in New Jersey
Russian-Jewish culture in the United States
Synagogues in New Jersey
Synagogues completed in 1896
Buildings and structures in Cape May County, New Jersey
Synagogues on the National Register of Historic Places in New Jersey
National Register of Historic Places in Cape May County, New Jersey
Ukrainian-Jewish culture in the United States
Museums in Cape May County, New Jersey
Woodbine, New Jersey
1896 establishments in New Jersey
Religious organizations established in 1896